The Grand prix de littérature de l'Académie française is a French literary award, established in 1911 by the Académie française. It goes to an author for their entire body of work. Originally an annual prize, it has since 1979 been handed out every second year, alternately with the Grand prix de littérature Paul-Morand.

Laureates

 1912: André Lafon
 1913: Romain Rolland
 1915: Émile Nolly
 1916: Pierre-Maurice Masson
 1917: Francis Jammes
 1918: Gérard d'Houville
 1919: Jean and Jérôme Tharaud
 1920: Edmond Jaloux
 1921: Anna de Noailles
 1922: Pierre Lasserre
 1923: François Porché
 1924: Abel Bonnard
 1925: E. Mangin
 1926: Gilbert de Voisins
 1927: Joseph de Pesquidoux
 1928: Jean-Louis Vaudoyer
 1929: Henri Massis
 1930: Marie-Louise Pailleron
 1931: Raymond Escholier
 1932: Franc-Nohain
 1933: Henri Duvernois
 1934: Henry de Montherlant
 1935: André Suarès
 1936: Pierre Camo
 1937: Maurice Magre
 1938: Tristan Derème
 1939: Jacques Boulenger
 1940: Edmond Pilon
 1941: Gabriel Faure
 1942: Jean Schlumberger
 1943: Jean Prévost
 1944: André Billy
 1945: Jean Paulhan
 1946: Daniel-Rops
 1947: Mario Meunier
 1948: Gabriel Marcel
 1949: Maurice Levaillant
 1950: Marc Chadourne
 1951: Henri Martineau
 1952: Marcel Arland 
 1953: Marcel Brion
 1954: Jean Guitton
 1955: Jules Supervielle 
 1956: Henri Clouard
 1958: Jules Roy
 1959: Thierry Maulnier 
 1960: Simone Le Bargy 
 1961: Jacques Maritain 
 1962: Luc Estang
 1963: Charles Vildrac
 1964: Gustave Thibon
 1965: Henri Petit
 1966: Henri Gouhier
 1967: Emmanuel Berl
 1968: Henri Bosco
 1969: Pierre Gascar
 1970: Julien Green
 1971: Georges-Emmanuel Clancier
 1972: Jean-Louis Curtis
 1973: Louis Guilloux
 1974: André Dhôtel
 1975: Henri Queffélec
 1976: José Cabanis
 1977: Marguerite Yourcenar
 1978: Paul Guth
 1979: Antoine Blondin
 1981: Jacques Laurent
 1983: Michel Mohrt
 1985: Roger Grenier
 1987: Jacques Brosse
 1989: Roger Vrigny
 1991: Jacques Lacarrière
 1993: Louis Nucéra
 1995: Jacques Brenner
 1997: Béatrix Beck
 1999: André Brincourt
 2001: Milan Kundera
 2003: Jean Raspail
 2005: Danièle Sallenave
 2007: Michel Chaillou 
 2009: Vincent Delecroix
 2011: Jean-Bertrand Pontalis
 2013: Michel Butor
 2015: Laurence Cossé
 2017: Charles Juliet
 2019: Régis Debray
 2021: Patrick Deville

References

Awards established in 1911
Académie Française awards
1911 establishments in France